Perimkend is a village de jure in the Khojaly District of Azerbaijan, de facto part of Askeran Province of the unrecognised Republic of Artsakh. It is suspected that this village has undergone a name change or no longer exists, as no Azerbaijani website mentions it under this name.

References 
 

Populated places in Khojaly District